Yun Won-Chol ( or  ; born July 3, 1989 in North Pyongan) is an amateur North Korean Greco-Roman wrestler, who competed in the men's featherweight category. Yun represented North Korea at the 2012 Summer Olympics in London, where he competed in the men's 55 kg class. He received a bye for the preliminary round of sixteen match, before losing to South Korea's Choi Gyu-Jin, who was able to score three points in two straight periods, leaving Yun without a single point.

In 2013, Yun became the world champion after he defeated Choi in the final at Budapest.

He competed for North Korea at the 2016 Summer Olympics in Rio de Janeiro in the 59 kg division. He defeated Haithem Mahmoud Fahmy of Egypt in the first round. He was then defeated by Elmurat Tasmuradov of Uzbekistan in the quarterfinals. Yun was the flag bearer for North Korea during the closing ceremony.

References

External links
Profile – International Wrestling Database

1989 births
Living people
North Korean male sport wrestlers
Olympic wrestlers of North Korea
Wrestlers at the 2012 Summer Olympics
Wrestlers at the 2016 Summer Olympics
Wrestlers at the 2010 Asian Games
People from North Pyongan
Wrestlers at the 2014 Asian Games
Asian Games medalists in wrestling
World Wrestling Championships medalists
Asian Games silver medalists for North Korea
Medalists at the 2014 Asian Games
Asian Wrestling Championships medalists